Ashton Fletcher Irwin (born 7 July 1994) is an Australian musician, best known as the drummer of the pop rock band 5 Seconds of Summer. Since 2014, 5 Seconds of Summer have sold more than 10 million albums, sold over 2 million concert tickets worldwide, and the band's songs streams surpass 7 billion, making them one of the most successful Australian musical exports in history.

Early life 
Ashton Fletcher Irwin was born on 7 July 1994 in Hornsby, New South Wales. His father, who is an American, left the family when Irwin was two years old. His mother, Anne-Marie, struggled with alcoholism, and as a result, he spent his childhood "hanging out with drunk people at pubs". He later elaborated, "My upbringing is […] interesting, I didn't have a father, my mom has struggled with alcoholism my whole life. I've grown up kind of bringing other people up…I've had to be relentlessly positive, and I have a very depressed mind". Irwin frequently moved houses as a child, mainly residing in Richmond and Windsor. Irwin's mother "didn't have a lot of money" and as a result, Irwin would "struggle to eat from week to week".

Irwin's uncle was a drummer in a death-metal band and his step-father played drums in a punk-rock band. Irwin learned how to play drums at nine years old after asking his step-father to teach him. Irwin helped raise his younger siblings, half-brother Harry and half-sister Lauren, whilst attending Richmond High School, from which he graduated in 2012. During his high school years, prior to the formation of 5 Seconds of Summer, Irwin formed a jazz-funk band called "Swallow the Goldfish" with his classmates. Ultimately departing from the band, Irwin pursued a year of higher education at a TAFE college, studying music, before choosing to leave due to his commitment to 5 Seconds of Summer.

Career 

In late 2011, Irwin received a Facebook message from friend and future band-mate, Michael Clifford, asking if Irwin was interested in casually playing music with him, Calum Hood and Luke Hemmings. Irwin agreed, eventually joining the trio in posting song covers on Hemmings' YouTube channel, and forming the 5 Seconds of Summer lineup. After months of posting song covers together, the band began attracting interest from major music labels and publishers and signed a publishing deal with Sony/ATV Music Publishing. Irwin has since released four studio albums with the band, each met with worldwide success: 5 Seconds of Summer (2014), Sounds Good Feels Good (2015), Youngblood (2018), and Calm (2020).

Apart from the band, Irwin has song-written and provided instrumentation for other artists, including Andy Black, The Faim and Makeout.

On 23 September 2020, Irwin announced the release of his debut solo album, titled Superbloom, which was released on 23 October 2020. It was preceded by the single, "Skinny Skinny", a track about issues concerning body image, something Irwin says he has "never confronted in a creative form". Irwin stated that "Superbloom explores my inner philosophies and feelings about the walk of life I have found myself on". He reiterated: "It brings me the greatest joy of all that I am in a band that allows me to create freely inside and outside of it".

Personal life 
Irwin has been open about his struggles with alcoholism and is an advocate for mental health. In 2018, Irwin admitted that during 5 Seconds of Summer's two-year break, he dealt "with [his] feelings in the beginning [of the hiatus] with just alcohol". In April 2020, Irwin revealed that, at the time, he had been sober for ten months. During the band's 2019 tour, Irwin documented, via his social media accounts, ice baths he partook in before each show as an affirmation of overcoming his substance abuse.

Irwin previously dated model Bryana Holly, with the pair dating for a year before splitting in June 2016. In 2018, Irwin began an on-again off again relationship with fashion blogger and photographer, Kaitlin Blaisdell.

In 2017, it was reported that Irwin bought a five-bedroom mansion in the Hollywood Hills neighborhood of Los Angeles. In 2018, it was reported that Irwin had bought a second property, a penthouse, in West Hollywood. As of 2020, Irwin's net-worth is estimated to be $25 million (USD).

Discography

Studio albums

Live albums

Singles

Songwriting credits

Videography

Music videos

Awards and nominations

References

External links 

1994 births
Living people
Australian male singer-songwriters
Musicians from Sydney
Australian people of American descent
Australian expatriates in the United States
21st-century Australian male singers
21st-century Australian singers
Australian rock drummers
Australian drummers
Male drummers